In organic chemistry, the diisopropylbenzenes constitute a group of aromatic hydrocarbons, whose chemical structure consists of a benzene ring with two isopropyl groups as substituents. Through their different arrangement, they form three structural isomers with the molecular formula .

References

Alkylbenzenes
Isopropyl compounds